Lungiarü is a village which forms a frazione of the commune of San Martin de Tor in South Tyrol, northern Italy. It is located in the Val Badia at an altitude of 1,398 metres.  It has a natural luge track in the winter.

Frazioni of South Tyrol
Former municipalities of South Tyrol